Cophixalus ateles (common name: Papua rainforest frog) is a species of frog in the family Microhylidae. It is endemic to Papua New Guinea.
Its natural habitat is tropical moist lowland forests.

References

ateles
Amphibians of Papua New Guinea
Endemic fauna of Papua New Guinea
Amphibians described in 1898
Taxonomy articles created by Polbot